Soraya Darabi ( ‘’Soraya Darabi’’; born 23 September 1955) is an Iranian teacher, journalist and trade union activist. Moreover, she was editor of the Teacher's Pen Weekly Paper and vice president of the Iran Teachers Trade Association (ITTA).

Union activities
Soraya Darabi was vice president of the ITTA and editor of Teacher's Pen Weekly Paper (هفته نامه قلم معلم) on May 9, 2007 when the Iranian security guards attacked teachers gathering in Tehran in front of the Iranian Islamic Parliament and arrested 22 teachers.

Darabi was one of the female teachers who were arrested. By Islamic Revolutionary Court’s decision, she was detained in Evin prison for 10 days before her release in exchange for $40,000 in bail.

Since November 5, 2007, Darabi has worked with Shirin Ebadi as a member of Iranian Mothers of Peace (Persian: ‘’’’Madarane Solhe’’’’ or مادران صلح) and before the shutdown of Defenders of Human Rights Center (DHRC) offices during the governance of Mahmoud Ahmadinejad.

Personal life
She is the wife of Mohammad Khaksari, the owner and editor in chief of Teacher's Pen = Ghalame Moalem and the co-founder of ITTA. She is the mother of Sajjad Khaksari, arrested photographer of Teacher's Pen.

See also
Education International
Amnesty International
Shirin Ebadi, human rights lawyer and judge; 2003 Nobel Laureate

References

External links
Facebook page of Teacher's Pen (هفته نامه قلم معلم)
Mothers of Peace - Iran
MaZanan (We, Women)
KHAKSARI.ORG (About)

1955 births
Living people
Education International
Iranian journalists
Iranian women writers
Iranian writers
Iranian trade unionists
Iranian schoolteachers